Ndhiwa is a small town in Kenya's Nyanza Province.

References 

Populated places in Nyanza Province